The Constitution of the Russian Soviet Federative Socialist Republic of 12 April 1978 was formally its supreme law.

History 

At its Extraordinary Session of 12 April 1978, the Supreme Soviet of the Russian SFSR adopted a new republican Constitution, to replace the old Russian Constitution of 1937, including its subsequent amendments. The new Constitution initially consisted of a Preamble and 185 articles, and was prepared as part of the whole process of bringing all 15 republican Constitutions in line with new Constitution of the Soviet Union of October 1977.

It was the fourth Constitution of the Russian SFSR. 
Following a turbulent period of democratization, dissolution of the Soviet Union and subsequent economic reform the Constitution was amended several times. It lost its legal force by the referendum of 12 December 1993, which was preceded by a power struggle between the President of Russia Boris Yeltsin and Russia's legislative institutions – the Congress of People's Deputies and the Supreme Soviet of Russia.

List of amendments

See also 
 Constitution of Russia (1993)
 Russian Constitution of 1918
 1977 Soviet Constitution

1978 documents
1978 in law
1978
1978 in Russia
Russian Soviet Federative Socialist Republic
Legal history of Russia
Constitutions of republics of the Soviet Union
April 1978 events in Europe